Nelly Andrée Viennot ( Bodé; born 8 January 1962 in Flers, Orne) is a French football referee. An international woman's referee since 1995, she served as an assistant referee in the 2003 FIFA Women's World Cup.

Viennot attracted the attention of the wider football community when she was shortlisted, along with 82 other elite referees, as a possible assistant referee for the 2006 FIFA World Cup. Viennot attended a four-day FIFA workshop in Frankfurt, hoping to become one of the 60 referees eventually chosen as assistant referees for the world's largest football tournament. However, she failed a sprint test on 21 April 2006, ending her consideration for participation. She would have been the first ever female referee at a male World Cup; no other referee has come as close to officiating in the tournament.

Viennot's refereeing career began in 1987, and she refereed her first international woman's match on 1 January 1995. Since 2002 she has regularly refereed French football at the top levels, and made appearances in the UEFA Champions League.

Honours
Chevalier of the Ordre national du Mérite: 2003

References

Viennot's FIFA profile
"Woman may be World Cup referee", Bangkok Post, date unknown.
"Female ref hopes to be at World Cup", SLAM sports, date unknown.
"Viennot won't be first female Cup ref", Associated Press, 21 April 2006.

1962 births
Living people
French football referees
Women association football referees
FIFA Women's World Cup referees
French women referees and umpires
Knights of the Ordre national du Mérite